Old Friend Mountain, is a  mountain in the Miscinchinka Ranges of the Hart Ranges in the Northern Rocky Mountains.

The mountain is a prominent feature along Highway 97 John Hart Highway, north of the Highway 39 junction.

References  

Canadian Rockies
Northern Interior of British Columbia
One-thousanders of British Columbia
Cariboo Land District